Metanarsia incertella is a moth of the family Gelechiidae. It is found in Spain, Algeria, Morocco, Tunisia, Turkey, Russia, Kazakhstan, Uzbekistan, western China and Mongolia.

The length of the forewings is 8–13 mm. The forewings are uniform yellowish-cream and the hindwings are light grey. Adults are on wing from May to early August.

References

Moths described in 1861
Metanarsia